Hypostomus leucophaeus is a species of catfish in the family Loricariidae. It is native to South America, where it occurs in the Itapicuru River basin in the state of Bahia in Brazil. The species reaches   in standard length. Its specific epithet, leucophaeus, is derived from Latin and means "ash-colored", in reference to the general coloration and patterning of the species.

References 

leucophaeus